Mamiellophyceae is a class of green algae in the division Chlorophyta.

See also 
 List of Mamiellophyceae genera

References

 
Green algae classes